Moxi is a town and township  in Luding County in the Garzê Tibetan Autonomous Prefecture of Sichuan, China.  As of 2000 it had 6,794 inhabitants. Moxi Town stands at the gateway to the Hailuogou Glacier Forest Park, south of Kangding and east of Mount Gongga. The town also featured in the Battle of Luding Bridge in 1935 when some of those who fought in the battle including Mao Zedong met in Moxi and stayed the night when the army marched through before heading north.

Moxi lies at roughly 1,600 meters above sea level, and the population are mainly ethnic Han Chinese, Yi and Tibetan with other minorities.

The main crossroads at the park entrance has hotels, restaurants and souvenir stalls. About 150 metres below is the original street of the village. It has a small Catholic church built in the 1920s with a colourful bell tower and a number of wooden shops.

The surrounding township is mainly pastoral land, and agriculture employs much of the population.

History 
On September 5, 2022, a magnitude 6.6 earthquake struck the town. At least 66 people were killed, 253 were injured, and 18 went missing. Numerous houses collapsed and landslides occurred in Moxi, where about 37 of the 66 fatalities occurred and 150 others were injured.

Footnotes

References
Leffman, David, et al. (2005). The Rough Guide to China. 4th Edition. Rough Guides, New York, London, Delhi. .

External links
Dreams Travel.com

Populated places in the Garzê Tibetan Autonomous Prefecture
Township-level divisions of Sichuan